The Highway 61 Motorcycle Club is an outlaw motorcycle club based in New Zealand and also operating in Australia. The Committee on Gangs report of 1981 (known as the Comber Report) said they were one of the two largest of the 20 outlaw motorcycle gangs in New Zealand. In the 1990s they were the largest in the country. They were still the largest in 2010, even though their membership numbers had declined. As of 2019 they were considered one of the ten main gangs (including motorcycle gangs and ethnically based gangs) in the country. Their membership is largely people of Māori and Pacific Island ethnicities. Their colours are black and gold.

History
The Highway 61 mc was formed in Auckland in 1967 or 1968, and have since expanded across New Zealand and Australia. The Highway 61 patch consists of a skeleton holding onto ape hangers (handlebars) with the road, or highway, seen below the skull.

In 1997, Highway 61 members were convicted of murdering a member of the New Zealand Nomads. In 1993, Highway 61 members were convicted of theft, receiving cars valued at nearly $1,000,000.

In 1998, senior ex member Malcolm Rewa was convicted on multiple charges of rape, and is serving a life prison sentence.

In 2003, club president Kevin Weavers was accidentally killed by ex highway 61 member Kelly Robertson, which weakened and caused a rift within the gang.

At the 1979 Nelson Mardi Gras event the Lost Breed clashed with members of Highway 61 from Wellington. 4 were injured and 21 Lost Breed members and associates were arrested.

They expanded into Australia in the 1980s, later setting up a chapter in Brisbane in 1998

See also

List of outlaw motorcycle clubs

References

Sources

Outlaw motorcycle clubs
Gangs in Australia
Gangs in New Zealand
Motorcycle clubs in Australia
Motorcycle clubs in New Zealand
1967 establishments in New Zealand